Boys is the surname of:

 C. V. Boys (1845–1944), English physicist
Daniel Boys (born March 26, 1979) English musical theater actor
 David Boys (died 1461), English theologian
 David Boys (Scrabble), Canadian Scrabble player, 1995 world champion
 Edward Boys (disambiguation)
 Frank Boys (1918–2003), English cricketer
 John Boys (disambiguation)
 Richard Boys (disambiguation)
 S. Francis Boys (1911–1972), English theoretical chemist
 Thomas Boys (1792–1880), theologian and antiquary
 Thomas Shotter Boys (1803–1874), water-colour painter
 William Boys (disambiguation)

See also
 Joseph Beuys (1921–1986), German artist